This is a list of cricketers who have played first-class, List A or Twenty20 cricket for Himachal Pradesh cricket team. Seasons given are first and last seasons; the player did not necessarily play in all the intervening seasons. Players in bold have played international cricket.

A
Kaunik Acharya, 1991/92
Ankit Aggarwal, 2004/05
Deepak Agnihotri, 1992/93
Amandeep, 1996/97
Rohit Awasthy

B
Manu Bhardwaj, 1987/88, (born 1975) is a former Indian cricketer. He was a leg-break bowler who played for Himachal Pradesh.

D
Navalkishore Dogra, 1996/97

M
Jitender Mehra, 1996/97

S
Tikam Singh, 1993/94

References

Himachal Pradesh cricketers

cricketers